Velleity is the lowest degree of volition, a slight wish or tendency.

Examples of usage

In philosophy

The 16th-century French philosopher Montaigne, in his essay On the Force of Imagination begins with the epigraph he cites from a schoolboy textbook, Fortis imaginatio generat casum, or "A strong imagination begets the event itself." In this essay, Montaigne describes the various ways that the will (or imagination as he calls it) causes people and other animals to do things or to have things done to them, with the barest of initiatives. In said essay, he links (what is now called) the placebo effect to the power of the will. For example, he describes how a certain Germain, was born a female named Mary, who "that by straining himself in a leap his male organs came out" at the age of 22. He also cites the stigmata of Dagobert and Saint Francis, and when the bride Laodice worshipping Venus cured her husband Amasis, King of Egypt of his impotence, among several other examples. 
 
Friedrich Nietzsche describes the velleity of an artist as a "desire to be 'what he is able to represent, conceive, and express'...."  Nietzsche championed the will to power, which can be encapsulated as starting with velleity, in his free-will theorem.

Keith David Wyma refers frequently to the "concept of velleity", citing Thomas Aquinas as a pioneer of introducing the idea into philosophy.

In psychology

Psychologist Avi Sion writes, "Many psychological concepts may only be defined and explained with reference to velleity." (Emphasis in original.)  An example he cites is that "an ordinarily desirable object can only properly be called 'interesting' or 'tempting' to that agent at that time, if he manifests some velleity...."
He distinguishes between the two types of velleity - "to do something and one not to do something...."  Furthermore, he asserts, "The concept of velleity is also important because it enables us to understand the co-existence of conflicting values."  A person could thus have "double velleity" or "a mix of velleity for something and a volition for its opposite: the latter dominates, of course, but that does not erase the fact of velleity."

See also

 Intention (criminal law)

References

Free will
Linguistics
Motivation